The Rocky Mountain Project is a recreational area, including areas for fishing, swimming, and camping, located outside the city of Rome, Georgia, United States.  It is compiled of two man-made lakes, totaling : Heath Lake and Antioch Lake. It is owned by Oglethorpe Power Corporation, and co-owned by Georgia Power. The Rocky Mountain Project recreational area is managed by the Georgia Department of Natural Resources, Wildlife Resources Division and funded by Oglethorpe Power.

History
It's named based on the Rocky Mountain Hydroelectric Plant that in turn created the recreation area. In the late 1970s Georgia Power purchased the land then known as Rock Mountain, from Berry College. It is said that if seen from an aerial view, Rock Mountain looked like a bowl, thus making it perfect for a hydroelectric plant. 15 years later, the massive hydroelectric facilities and recreation areas were completed, and opened to the public.

Heath Lake

Some common fish in the lake include: Largemouth bass, Bluegill, Crappie, Channel Catfish, Redear Sunfish, and Hybrid White Striped Bass.

Antioch Lake
It also includes a man made "beach." Like Heath Lake, fishing is very common in Antioch Lake.

References

External links
Rocky Mountain Project website

Protected areas of Floyd County, Georgia
Reservoirs in Georgia (U.S. state)
Bodies of water of Floyd County, Georgia
Georgia Power dams
Oglethorpe Power